Extended Play '07 is an EP by British alternative rock band Placebo, released on 31 July 2007 in the US only. It contains a popular single from every one of their albums as well as three live tracks. The EP was released mainly as a promotional item, targeting new fans created in the wake of the band's inclusion in Projekt Revolution 2007.

Track listing

Personnel
Placebo
Brian Molko – vocals, guitar
Stefan Olsdal – guitar, bass, backing vocals
Steve Hewitt – drums, percussion, backing vocals

References

External links

Placebo (band) EPs
2007 EPs
2007 compilation albums